Alfred Thomas Davies could refer to:
 Sir Alfred Davies (civil servant) (1861–1949), education official
 Sir Alfred Davies (Lincoln MP) (1881–1941), politician